Aodán Mac Gearailt is a footballer from County Kerry. He played with An Ghaeltacht and the Kerry teams in the 1990s and 2000s, winning County Championships in 2001 and 2003 he also won a Munster Club Championship in 2003 and played in the 2004 All Ireland Club Final but ended up on the losing side. He joined Cork side Ballygarvan in 2009 but returned to An Ghaeltacht after only one year with the Cork side. He won an All Ireland Senior Football Championship in 2000 with Kerry. He also won an All Ireland Under 21 medal in 1998. In 2009, he was made trainer of the Cork senior hurling team by Gerald McCarthy during the players strike.

References

Year of birth missing (living people)
Living people
An Ghaeltacht Gaelic footballers
Ballygarvan Gaelic footballers
Carrigdhoun Gaelic footballers
Kerry inter-county Gaelic footballers
Winners of one All-Ireland medal (Gaelic football)